Willis Taylor "Slick" Stewart (September 7, 1887 – January 27, 1960) was an American college football player, coach, and athletics administrator. He played for Dan McGugin's Vanderbilt Commodores football teams and coached the Transylvania Pioneers football team.

Willis served as the head football coach at Texas Christian University (TCU) for one season in 1912, achieving a record of 8–1.

Head coaching record

References

External links
 

1887 births
1960 deaths
American football ends
TCU Horned Frogs athletic directors
TCU Horned Frogs football coaches
Transylvania Pioneers athletic directors
Transylvania Pioneers football coaches
Vanderbilt Commodores football players
All-Southern college football players
People from Graham, Texas
People from Jack County, Texas
Coaches of American football from Texas
Players of American football from Texas